Kings City ("עיר המלכים" in Hebrew) was a biblical theme park in Eilat, Israel, which was inaugurated in June 2005. It is owned by "Africa Israel", "Elran d.d. Real Estate ltd" and a Swiss investor. The park could handle 4500 visitors per day. It closed in June 2015.

Attractions 

Built over a  area on three levels, the park resembles a king's palace. The palace has five sections:

 Journey To The Past
A journey back to the era of the Pharaohs in ancient Egypt via a four-dimensional display composed of huge panoramic screens that create the impression of floating above Pharaoh' palaces and temples.

 Cave Of Illusions And Wisdom
This cave was constructed to celebrate and honor the wisdom of King Solomon, and includes over 70 displays of optical illusions, labyrinths, self tests and other interactive challenges.

 Bible Cave

A journey deep into the ground and through King Solomon's mines, with famous Bible scenes displayed in niches carved into the walls.

 King Solomon's Waterfalls

A boat ride that follows the life story of King Solomon. Visitors sail through seven caves, each marking a chapter in the life of King Solomon, and complete the experience by gliding down the falls to the King Solomon lake next to his castle. (For safety reasons, the minimum height is 120 cm.)

 Spiral of David Slides
Two Dry slides that start from over approximately 66 feet. The sliding speed is up to 31 mph, and the slides end on the Cave Of Illusions And Wisdom.

Sources
 The Kings City biblical theme park opens in Eilat
 Information from Africa Israel

References

External links

Kings City home page (flash)
Kings City under construction
Photo gallery, August 2005 (111 photos)

Amusement parks in Israel
History of Eilat
Buildings and structures in Southern District (Israel)
Tourist attractions in Southern District (Israel)
2005 establishments in Israel
Amusement parks opened in 2005
Hebrew Bible in popular culture
Tourism in Eilat
Defunct amusement parks